First Time is a 2012 Chinese romance film written and directed by Han Yan (韓延).

It is a remake of the 2003 South Korean film ...ing.

Plot
Song Shiqiao (Angelababy), 22, lives with her devoted mother, widowed shop owner Zheng Qing (Jiang Shan). Shiqiao, who always dreamed of being a ballet dancer, cannot exert herself physically as she suffers from form of myasthenia, a neuromuscular disease, that her father died of; the medication she takes also causes memory lapses. One day, at a charity fair, she bumps into Gong Ning (Mark Chao), a former high-school friend she always liked, and the two end up dating, despite the initial disapproval of her mother. Gong Ning dropped out of university to spend more time with a rock band he leads; also, his girlfriend, dancer Peng Wei (Cindy Yen), has dumped him because of his inability to focus his life. However, for Shiqiao, Gong Ning is the perfect partner.

Cast
Angelababy as Song Shiqiao
Mark Chao as Gong Ning / Lü Xia
Jiang Shan as Zheng Qing, Shiqiao's mother
Cindy Yen as Peng Wei, Gong Ning's ex-girlfriend
Allen Chao as Gong Ning's father
Tian Yuan as Gu Qi, rock band member
Bai Baihe as Wei Jiajia, rival rock singer
Huang Xuan as Li Rao, Peng Wei's new boyfriend
Zhao Yingjun as rock band member
Wu Xiaoliang
Fan Lin

References

Chinese romance films
2012 romance films
2012 films
Chinese remakes of South Korean films
Films directed by Han Yan
2010s Mandarin-language films